Cass River may refer to:

Cass River (Mackenzie District), New Zealand
Cass River (Selwyn District), New Zealand
Cass River (Michigan), United States
Cass River Railroad, defunct railroad, Michigan, United States